Cape Breton Regional Hospital is a Canadian hospital in Sydney, Nova Scotia.

Operated by the Nova Scotia Health Authority, the Cape Breton Regional Hospital opened in 1995, replacing the Sydney City Hospital (opened in 1916) and St. Rita's Hospital (opened in 1920).

Cape Breton Regional Hospital operates as a tertiary care referral hospital for residents of Cape Breton Island.

Cape Breton Regional Hospital is also a teaching hospital for the Faculty of Medicine at Dalhousie University in Halifax, Nova Scotia.

Services
 Emergency
 Ambulatory Care
 Diagnostic Imaging

See also
 List of hospitals in Canada 
 Cape Breton Regional Municipality

References

Hospital buildings completed in 1995
Hospitals in the Cape Breton Regional Municipality
Teaching hospitals in Canada
Hospitals established in 1995
Heliports in Canada
Certified airports in Nova Scotia